The women's 3000 metres at the 1996 Asian Winter Games was held on 5 February 1996 in Harbin, China.

Records

Results

References
Results

External links
Changchun 2007 Official website

Women 3000
1996 in women's speed skating